Anti-apartheid may refer to any opposition to apartheid, the 1948–94 racial policy of the South African government; in particular:

 Internal resistance to apartheid, within South Africa
 Anti-Apartheid Movement, an organisation founded in Britain

See also